Wizard Reef is a coral reef in the Farquhar Group in the Outer Islands of the Seychelles.

History
The reef was named after Fairfax Moresby's ship called the Wizard, which visited the reef in 1822.

Geography
The reef is roughly elliptical. It measures 1.7 km east–west and 1.2 km north–south, covering an area of about 1.6 km2. The land mass is barely 0.02 km2. It is barely above water, as the sea breaks heavily over it. The reef's islet is in the western half. The location is 41 km north of the northern tip of Providence Atoll.

Administration
The reef belongs to Outer Islands District.

Flora and fauna
The islet has many hawksbill turtles nesting.

Image gallery

References

External links 

 Info on the reef

Islands of Outer Islands (Seychelles)
Reefs
Uninhabited islands of Seychelles